Happy, Texas is a 1999 American comedy film directed by Mark Illsley and starring Steve Zahn, Jeremy Northam and William H. Macy. The film premiered at the 1999 Sundance Film Festival and was acquired by Miramax. It had a limited release in North American theaters on October 1, 1999.

Plot
Three prisoners escape from a chain gang, and two of them, Wayne and Harry, steal an RV. They discover that the RV actually belongs to two gay men who travel around Texas as consultants for beauty pageants. They are apprehended by Chappy Dent, the sheriff of Happy, Texas, who mistakes the escapees for the pageant organizers. Posing as the organizers, Wayne and Harry proceed to help out with the pageant while hiding from the law and waiting for an opportunity to rob the local bank. 

The duo's scheme is complicated by the fact that Chappy himself is gay and is attracted to the prisoner Harry. Straight Harry, on the other hand, becomes attracted to Josephine, the president of the bank. Meanwhile, "gay" David, also actually straight, gets involved with the local pageant coordinator, Doreen. 

By the day of the big pageant, the third escaped convict has surfaced, leading Wayne and Harry to organize a break-in during the show. Harry calls in more police, and in the process, all three are apprehended. In the last scene, the pageant group that Wayne helped train came to the prison to show them the closing number, in the costumes he made.

Cast

Production
With the exception of a few scenes, the film was shot entirely on location in Piru, California. One scene was filmed at Oil Can Harry's in Studio City, Los Angeles.

Reception

Release 
The film debuted at the 1999 Sundance Film Festival. Its premiere sparked a bidding war between various film distributors. Miramax won the bid, but reports conflicted on exactly how much the company paid to acquire the film. While Miramax maintained they only paid $2.5 million, other reports said the number was closer to $10 million. 

Miramax gave the film a limited release in the United States on October 1, 1999. The film grossed $72,056 in its opening weekend and went on to gross nearly $2 million in the United States and Canada.

Critical reception
The film received a "Certified Fresh" 81% rating on Rotten Tomatoes, based on 58 critics' reviews. The site's critics consensus states, "Happy, Texas is a simple, funny romantic comedy that benefits from a very talented cast and a good soundtrack." On Metacritic, the film has a score of 62 based on 31 critics' reviews.

Roger Ebert of the Chicago Sun-Times gave it three out of four stars. He wrote the film's strong point is its "actors sell the situation so amusingly--and warmly", Zahn is especially funny, and Northam is "a revelation...here is the slick, urbane British gentleman of 'Emma,' 'The Winslow Boy' and 'An Ideal Husband,' playing a Texas convict and not missing a beat." Ebert concluded, "Macy's performance as the quietly, earnestly in love sheriff is the most touching in the movie, another role in which he gets laughs by finding the truth beneath the humor."

Soundtrack

The soundtrack album for Happy, Texas features a mix of mostly country music by such artists as Emmylou Harris, Alison Krauss, Lee Roy Parnell, Pam Tillis, Brad Paisley and BR5-49. There are also bits of Tejano (Flaco Jimenez) and exotica (Yma Sumac).

Track listing
"Passin' Through" (Randy Scruggs and Joan Osborne) – 5:16
"Good at Secrets" (Kim Richey) – 4:20
"This Little Light of Mine"/"Fort Davis Contestant" (Carly Fink) – 0:17
"Are You Happy Baby?" (Lee Roy Parnell and Keb' Mo') – 2:27
"Ordinary Heart" (Emmylou Harris) – 2:58
"Baila Este Ritmo" (Flaco Jiménez) – 3:17
"After a Kiss" (Pam Tillis) – 4:10
"Me Neither" (Brad Paisley) – 3:22
"Stay" (Alison Krauss) – 3:26
"Half a Man" (Shannon Brown) – 2:35
"Gopher Mambo" (Yma Sumac) – 2:17
"Honky Tonk Song" (BR5-49) – 2:38
"That Buckin' Song (Saddle Sore Mix)" (Robert Earl Keen) – 3:51
"Hurdy Gurdy Monkey Shine" (Road Kings) – 2:17
"Happiness" (Abra Moore) – 4:28
"It's Oh So Quiet" (Happy Girls) – 1:29
Cover of song popularized by Björk

See also
 List of American films of 1999

References

External links
 
 
 
 

1999 comedy films
1999 films
American LGBT-related films
Country music films
Films set in Texas
American comedy films
American independent films
1999 independent films
1990s English-language films
1990s American films
Films about beauty pageants